The ceremonial county of Buckinghamshire, which includes the unitary authority of Milton Keynes, currently returns seven MPs to the UK Parliament.

As a result of the local government reorganisation introduced by the Local Government Act 1972, which came into effect on 1 April 1974, the boundaries of the historic/administrative county were altered, with southernmost parts, including the Borough of Slough, being transferred to the county of Berkshire. This was reflected in the following redistribution of parliamentary seats which came into effect for the 1983 general election and effectively reduced the county's representation by one MP.

Number of seats 
The table below shows the number of MPs representing Buckinghamshire at each major redistribution of seats affecting the county.

1Prior to 1950, seats were classified as County Divisions or Parliamentary Boroughs. Since 1950, they have been classified as County or Borough Constituencies.

2Additional seat created at interim review (see below).

Timeline 

1Borough was formally known as Chipping Wycombe

Boundary reviews

See also 

 List of parliamentary constituencies in Buckinghamshire

References 

Parliamentary constituencies in Buckinghamshire (historic)